Pseudoliotina sensuyi is an extinct species of sea snail, a marine gastropod mollusk, in the family Skeneidae.

References

External links
 Vidal, L. M. (1921). Contribución a la paleontología del cretácico de Cataluña. Boletín de la Real Academia de Ciencias y Artes de Barcelona. ser. 3, 17(2): 89-107

Skeneidae